Christian "Chris" James Hopkins (born February 26, 1985) is a former American football tight end. He played college football at the university of Toledo and high school football at Hyde Park High School in Chicago. He was signed by the New York Giants as an rookie free agent on July 30, 2011. Hopkins earned a Super Bowl ring as a member of the Giants team who topped the New England Patriots by a score of 21–17 in Super Bowl XLVI on February 5, 2012.

References

External links
Toledo Rockets bio
New York Giants bio

1985 births
Living people
American football tight ends
Hyde Park Academy High School alumni
New York Giants players
Players of American football from Chicago
Toledo Rockets football players